Milk River may refer to:

Rivers
 Milk River (British Columbia), a tributary of the upper Fraser River in Canada
 Milk River (Michigan), United States
 Milk River (Alberta–Montana), a tributary of the Missouri River
 Milk River (Jamaica)

Places
 Milk River, Alberta, a town in Canada
 Milk River Airport, Alberta
 Milk River Ridge, Alberta, Canada
 Milk River Ridge Reservoir, a large body of water in southern Alberta, Canada
 Milk River Bath, Jamaica

See also 
 Dudh Kosi, a river in eastern Nepal
 Milk (disambiguation)